Potato Island may refer to
 Potato Island (Severn Sound) in Ontario
 Potato Island (Branford) off Stony Creek, Connecticut